Burke High School can refer to:

Omaha Burke High School in Omaha, Nebraska
Burke High School (South Carolina) in Charleston, South Carolina
Burke High School (South Dakota) in Burke, South Dakota
Burke High School (Massachusetts) in Boston, Massachusetts
John S. Burke Catholic High School ("Burke Catholic"), Goshen, Orange County, New York